Henry Bayly (19 November 1850 – 7 January 1903) was an Australian cricketer. He played two first-class matches for Tasmania between 1870 and 1878.

See also
 List of Tasmanian representative cricketers

References

External links
 

1850 births
1903 deaths
Australian cricketers
Tasmania cricketers
Cricketers from Tasmania